The Future Kings of England are a British progressive rock band from Ipswich. Influenced by early Pink Floyd, Hawkwind, and a bit of King Crimson their music also contains some post-rock along the lines of Mogwai or Sigur Rós.

Discography
2003: 10:66 (EP)
2005: The Future Kings of England
2007: The fate of old mother Orvis
2009: The viewing point
2011: Who Is This Who Is Coming

Personnel
Ian Fitch - guitars
Karl Mallett - Bass
Simon Green - Drums
Steven Mann - Keyboards

See also
 'Oh, Whistle, and I'll Come to You, My Lad', the ghost story that Who Is This Who Is Coming is based on.

References

External links
 
 

English progressive rock groups